The Church of Saint Michael Garicoits, popularly known as Iglesia de los Vascos (Spanish for "the church of the Basque people") is a Roman Catholic parish church in Montevideo, Uruguay.

History
The origins of this temple date back to 1856, when the first Betharram Fathers arrived. An important part of the social and religious life of Basque immigrants was linked with this church for decades; services were held in Euskera back then. The church, designed by French architect Víctor Rabú in eclectic historicist style, was consecrated in 1870.

It is dedicated to their founder, St. Michael Garicoits, and to the Immaculate Conception of the Virgin Mary (f which there is a Latin inscription over the entrance).

The parish was established on 30 October 1919.

References

Centro, Montevideo
1919 establishments in Uruguay
Roman Catholic churches completed in 1870
Roman Catholic church buildings in Montevideo
19th-century Roman Catholic church buildings in Uruguay